The Volgograd State Pedagogical University (abbreviation: VSPU) is one of the major pedagogical institutions in the Russian Federation. The university is located in Volgograd, formerly known as Stalingrad (Russia).

History of the University
Established by decree of the Council of the People's Commissars of the USSR in 1931, it was previously known as the Stalingrad Industrial Pedagogical Institute. It was completely ruined during the Stalingrad battle of World War II and its library burnt out.  In 1949, the school was renamed in honor of a Russian Proletarian writer, Alexander Serafimovich. Under political reforms of Nikita Khrushchev, the city was renamed from Stalingrad to Volgograd in 1961, and the name of the institution was changed to the Volgograd State Pedagogical Institute. In 1992 it was granted university status.

For the past ten years, the university stands amongst 10 best leading pedagogical and linguistic universities in Russia and 100 best universities worldwide.

Photograph of the building

Structure of the University
Today, the urban structure of the university includes Institute of Primary and Special Education, Foreign Languages Institute, Institute of Art Education, and Institute of Computerized Pedagogics. There are four buildings on campus with over 13,000 students: 13,000 full-time and part-time students and about 200 post-graduates and foreign students who study at their own expense. Also, there is a branch of VSPU located in Mikhaylovka, Volgograd Oblast.

VSPU has 43 research centers and laboratories, 16 faculties, offers four-year bachelor (Russian: бакалавр) degrees, 33 two-year master (Russian: магистр) degrees and kandidat nauk (Candidate of science, equals PhD) postgraduate degrees, and 6 doktor nauk (Doctor of science, equals Full Professor) post doctoral degrees.

Faculties and Departments

Mathematics
Physics
Natural sciences and geography
History and Law
Economics and Management
Philology (Russian and Literature)
Foreign Languages
Psychology and Social Work
Physical Training
Technology and Service
Primary School Education
Special Education
Visual Arts
Musical Education
Faculty for Foreign Students
In-Service Training
Vocational Training

Scientific Research and Academic Relations
VSPU is a federal experimental base of the Russian Academy of Education, it is developing the ideas of continuous pedagogical education and interaction of pedagogics and school teaching techniques.

The university maintains international academic relations with higher education institutions o United States, Germany, Austria, Netherlands, France, People's Republic of China, Serbia, Czechoslovakia, Ukraine, and Kazakhstan.

Library and publishing services
, the VSPU library collection contains about 852,000 copies. Its fund of research literature on Psychology and Pedagogics is considered the most valuable and is represented by the monographs by Yury Babansky, Pavel Blonsky, Vasily Vodovozov (:ru:Водовозов, Василий Иванович), Vasily Vakhterov (:ru:Вахтеров, Василий Порфирьевич), Anatoly Zak, Leonid Zankov (:ru:Занков, Леонид Владимирович), John Amos Comenius, Peter Lesgaft, Anton Makarenko, Johann Heinrich Pestalozzi, Nikolay Pirogov, Vasyl Sukhomlynsky, Konstantin Ushinsky, Lev Vygotsky, Daniil Elconin (:ru:Эльконин, Даниил Борисович, :de:Daniil Borissowitsch Elkonin), David Feldstein, and M. Kle.

Scientific research results have been published ten times a year in the VSPU journal, titled Izvestia Volgogradskogo Pedagogicheskogo Universiteta, .

See also
Russian educational system
:cs:Medaile Jana Amose Komenského (rozcestník) (John Amos Comenius Medal)

References

External links
 

Universities and institutes established in the Soviet Union
Educational institutions established in 1931
Universities in Volgograd Oblast
Buildings and structures in Volgograd
1931 establishments in Russia
Teachers colleges in Russia